Alexandra Kolesnichenko (born 14 December 1992) is an Uzbekistani tennis player.

Kolesnichenko has won one doubles title on the ITF tour in her career. On 21 September 2009, she reached her best singles ranking of world number 577. On 21 September 2009, she peaked at world number 517 in the doubles rankings.

Playing for Uzbekistan at the Fed Cup, Kolesnichenko has a win–loss record of 2–0.

ITF finals (1–2)

Singles (0–1)

Doubles (1–1)

Fed Cup participation

Doubles

References

External links 
 
 
 

1992 births
Living people
Sportspeople from Tashkent
Uzbekistani female tennis players
Uzbekistani people of Russian descent
21st-century Uzbekistani women